Zagajski Vrh is a settlement in the Municipality of Gornja Radgona in northeastern Slovenia.

There are three small chapel-shrines in the village, each bearing its own belfry and all dating to the early 20th century.

References

External links
Zagajski Vrh on Geopedia

Populated places in the Municipality of Gornja Radgona